Linet is a feminine given name.

List of people with the given name 

 Linet (born 1975), Israeli-born Turkish-Jewish singer
 Linet Arasa (born 1996), Kenyan rugby player
 Linet Kwamboka (born 1988), Kenyan computer scientist and businesswoman
 Linet Masai (born 1989), Kenyan runner
 Linet Toroitich Chebet (born 1992), Ugandan runner
 Linet Toto (born 1997), Kenyan politician

See also 

 Lynnette
 Line (given name)
 Martha S. Linet

Feminine given names
African feminine given names